The 2013 Idaho Vandals football team represented the University of Idaho in the 2013 NCAA Division I FBS football season. The Vandals were led by first year head coach Paul Petrino and played their home games at the Kibbie Dome. This was Idaho's first and only season as an independent. They became a football only member of the Sun Belt Conference in 2014.

Schedule

Source:

Game summaries

at North Texas

at Wyoming

Northern Illinois

at Washington State

Temple

Fresno State

at Arkansas State

at Ole Miss

Texas State

Old Dominion

at Florida State

at New Mexico State

References

Idaho
Idaho Vandals football seasons
Idaho Vandals football